Deerfield Pike Tollgate House was located in Upper Deerfield Township, Cumberland County, New Jersey, United States. The house was built in 1853 and was added to the National Register of Historic Places on May 21, 1975. The house was demolished in 2001.

See also
National Register of Historic Places listings in Cumberland County, New Jersey

References

Houses on the National Register of Historic Places in New Jersey
Houses in Cumberland County, New Jersey
Houses completed in 1853
National Register of Historic Places in Cumberland County, New Jersey
Upper Deerfield Township, New Jersey
New Jersey Register of Historic Places
1853 establishments in New Jersey
2001 disestablishments in New Jersey
Buildings and structures demolished in 2001